Acid etching may mean:

Glass etching, etching glass
Etching, acid etching of metal surfaces in printing
Printed circuit board#Chemical etching, acid etching in the production of circuit boards
Chemical milling, industrial acid etching